Vladyslav Didenko ( (born September 19, 1992) is a Ukrainian volleyball player, a member of the Ukraine men's national volleyball team and Epicentr-Podoliany.

Career
Vladyslav Didenko started his professional career in Yurydychna Akademiya Kharkiv.

He was a member of the Ukraine men's national volleyball team in 2019 Men's European Volleyball Championship.

Sporting achievements

Clubs 
Ukrainian Championship:
 x1  2017/18
Ukrainian Cup:
 x2  2016/17, 2017/18
Ukrainian Supercup:
 x1  2016/17
Vyshcha Liha:
 x1  2013/14

Individual 
 2015/2016 Best Setter  Ukrainian Championship
 2016/2017 Best Setter  Ukrainian Championship
 2016/2017 Best Setter  Ukrainian Cup
 2017/2018 Best Setter  Ukrainian Cup
 2017/2018 MVP  Ukrainian Championship

References

Ukrainian men's volleyball players
VC Barkom-Kazhany players
VC Epitsentr-Podoliany players
VC Yurydychna Akademiya Kharkiv players
1992 births
Living people
Sportspeople from Khmelnytskyi Oblast